Pearl Airways or Pearl Airways Compagne Haitienne was an airline based in Haiti.

Defunct airlines of Haiti